Ajeti is a surname. Notable people with the surname include:

Adonis Ajeti (born 1997), Swiss footballer
Albian Ajeti (born 1997), Swiss footballer
Arlind Ajeti (born 1993), Albanian footballer
Bardhyl Ajeti (born 1977), reporter for the Albanian-language daily newspaper Bota Sot  
Melihate Ajeti (born 1935), Kosovar Albanian actress
Vahedin Ajeti (born 1960), Kosovar Albanian footballer

Albanian-language surnames